A list of films produced in Russia in 2021 (see 2021 in film).

Film releases

Cultural Russian films
 I'm Not a Terrorist (Russian: Я - не террорист) is a 2021 Uzbek war film directed by Muhammad Ali Iskandarov.
 The King's Man is a 2021 British spy action film directed by Matthew Vaughn.
 Nobody is a 2021 American action thriller comedy film directed by Ilya Naishuller.
 Our Men is a 2021 French-Belgian drama film directed by Rachel Lang.

See also 
 2021 in film
 2021 in Russia

References

2021
Films
Lists of 2021 films by country or language